
Henrique "Rico" S. Malvar (born 1957) is a distinguished Brazilian engineer and a signal processing researcher at Microsoft Research's largest laboratory in Redmond, Washington, United States. He was the managing director of the lab following the departure of long-time Managing Director Dan Ling in 2007, when he oversaw about 350 researchers. He was a Distinguished Engineer at Microsoft for over 15 years. He retired from Microsoft in January 2023, and later received the title of Microsoft Emeritus Researcher.

Rico is also an Affiliate Professor at the Electrical and Computer Engineering Department at the University of Washington.

History and contributions 

Malvar earned his bachelor's degree at the University of Brasília and his master's degree at the Federal University of Rio de Janeiro. He received his Ph.D. in electrical engineering and computer science from the Massachusetts Institute of Technology (MIT) in 1986, where his thesis was on "Optimal pre- and post-filtering in noisy sampled-data systems," and served as a visiting professor at MIT for the next year. From 1979 to 1993, Malvar was a faculty member at the University of Brasília, where he founded and headed the Digital Signal Processing Research Group (in Portuguese, Grupo de Processamento Digital de Sinais or GPDS).

Malvar is known for the development of the lapped transform, Malvar wavelets, and new algorithms for entropy coding and multimedia signal processing and compression, such as audio and image codecs.

In industry, Malvar served as vice president of Research and Advanced Technology at PictureTel from 1985 to 1987 (which has since been acquired by Polycom). In Fall 1997, he joined Microsoft Research where he co-founded and managed the Signal Processing research group, now the Communication and Collaboration Systems and Knowledge Tools groups. He was a Redmond lab director from 2004 to 2007 before stepping up to become managing director. In 2010 he took on a new position of Chief Scientist, working on cross-labs strategic projects. Currently, as a Distinguished Engineer, he leads a team that develops new user experiences with new devices and new input/output interaction modes, with special attention to inclusiveness and empowering people with disabilities.

At Microsoft, Malvar contributed to the development of audio coding and digital rights management for the Windows Media Audio, Windows Media Video, and to image compression technologies, such as HD Photo / JPEG XR formats and the RemoteFX bitmap compression, as well as to a variety of tools for signal analysis and synthesis.

As of February 2022, he has published over 180 technical articles and has authored or co-authored over 120 issued patents.

Editorial and committee positions 

Malvar has served as an editor or committee member for the following journals, conferences, and organizations:

 Associate editor of IEEE Transactions on Signal Processing
 Editorial board of Applied and Computational Harmonic Analysis
 Technical committee for the IEEE International Conference on Acoustics, Speech, and Signal Processing (ICASSP)
 Technical committee for the Data Compression Conference (DCC)
 Advisory committee for the National Science Foundation Directorate for Computer & Information Science & Engineering
 Member of the Special Nomination Committee for the National Academy of Engineering

Titles and awards 
Malvar holds the following prestigious titles and awards. A sample:

 1981: The Young Scientist Award from the Marconi International Fellowship Foundation
 1992: Best Paper Award in Image Processing from the IEEE Signal Processing Society
 1997: Fellow of the Institute of Electrical and Electronics Engineers (IEEE)
 2002: Technical Achievement Award from the IEEE Signal Processing Society
 2004: Wavelet Pioneer Award from SPIE
 2006: Distinguished Engineer at Microsoft.
 2012: Member of the US National Academy of Engineering (NAE).
 2014: 20th Century Landmark Award, IEEE Seattle Section.
 2020: Amar G. Bose Industrial Leader Award, IEEE Signal Processing Society.
 2022: Doctor Honoris Causa from the University of Brasilia.

References

External links 

 Bill Hinchberger. 
 Anais Fernandes. "Ler pensamentos é algo que não está longe. Revista Veja, portal Amarelas.com, December 2017.
 Marcelo Tas. "Entrevista com Rico Malvar". Programa Provoca, TV Cultura, March 2022.

1957 births
Living people
People from Rio de Janeiro (city)
Brazilian computer scientists
University of Brasília alumni
Federal University of Rio de Janeiro alumni
MIT School of Engineering alumni
Microsoft employees
Fellow Members of the IEEE